The 1941 Prairie View Panthers football team was an American football team that represented Prairie View Normal and Industrial College—now known as Prairie View A&M University—as a member of the Southwestern Athletic Conference (SWAC) during the 1941 college football season. Led by 11th-year head coach Sam B. Taylor, the Panthers compiled an overall record of 7–1–2 with a mark of 4–0–2 in conference play, winning the SWAC title. At the SWAC winter meeting on December 13, Prairie View's title was forfeited because the Panthers had used an ineligible player, Whiteside. No conference champion is recognized for 1941.

Schedule

References

Prairie View
Prairie View A&M Panthers football seasons
Prairie View Panthers football